"Hot 'Lanta" is an instrumental piece performed by the Allman Brothers Band. It debuted on their live album At Fillmore East, released in July 1971, the fifth track on the album. "Hotlanta" is a controversial nickname for Atlanta, Georgia, and is a portmanteau of the words "hot" and "Atlanta".

Composition 
The song begins with a statement of the theme, followed by solos from Gregg Allman (organ), Duane Allman (guitar), and Dickey Betts (guitar). There is then a (duet) drum break, and then a restatement of the theme, which ends on a dissonant chord that fades into a drone of organ and intermittent snare drum rolls, then growing into a powerful crescendo accentuated by the timpani playing of drummer Butch Trucks.

The composition has elements in common with jazz rock and progressive rock.

References 

1971 songs
The Allman Brothers Band songs
American progressive rock songs
Rock instrumentals
Songs written by Gregg Allman
Songs written by Dickey Betts